Surendra Singh may refer to:

 Surendra Singh (ambassador) (1923–1996), last ruler of Alirajpur State, and Indian ambassador to Spain
 Surendra Singh (athlete) (born 1978), Indian long-distance runner
 Surendra Singh (Baghal State) (1909–1945), ruler of Baghal State 1922–1945 
 Surendra Singh (cabinet secretary), Indian civil servant
 Surendra Kumar Singh (politician) (1932–2015), Indian politician and a scion of the princely state of Raigarh
 Surendra Narayan Singh, Indian politician representing Rohaniya, Varanasi district, in the Legislative Assembly of Uttar Pradesh
 Surendra Nath Singh (born 1962), Indian politician representing Bairia, Ballia district, in the Legislative Assembly of Uttar Pradesh
 Surendra Pratap Singh (1948–1997), Indian journalist

Fictional
 Maharaja Surendra Singh, King of Naugarh, in the Chandrakanta (novel) and Chandrakanta (TV series)

See also
 Surendra Singh Baghel (b. 1977), politician in Madhya Pradesh
 Surendra Singh Bhoi, representative Titlagarh (Odisha Vidhan Sabha constituency) 2009-2014
 Surendra Singh Chauhan, representative Barauli, Uttar Pradesh (Vidhan Sabha constituency) 1974–1977, 1980-1991
 Surendra Singh Nagar, politician, Gautam Buddha Nagar constituency of Uttar Pradesh 
 Surendra Singh Panwar (1919–2002),  artillery officer, Indian Army, brigadier
 Surendra Singh Patel, politician, Sewapuri constituency seat in Varanasi, Uttar Pradesh